Bidari García de Cortázar Mejías (born 27 September 1989) is a Spanish footballer and international model who plays as a defender. He most recently played for Chilean Primera División B side Deportes Puerto Montt.

Career
García has played in Spain for Cartagena, Leganés and SS Reyes before moving to Cyprus to play for Ethnikos Achna. He then had spells playing in Bolivia and Bangladesh.

On 2 February 2018, García joined Gibraltar Premier Division side Lincoln Red Imps.

References

External links
 
 

1989 births
Living people
Spanish footballers
Spanish expatriate footballers
Association football defenders
FC Cartagena footballers
Segunda División players
CD Leganés players
UD San Sebastián de los Reyes players
Ethnikos Achna FC players
Plaza Colonia players
Puerto Montt footballers
Tercera División players
Segunda División B players
Cypriot First Division players
Primera B de Chile players
Expatriate footballers in Chile
Expatriate footballers in Uruguay
Expatriate footballers in Cyprus
Expatriate footballers in Bangladesh